Baron Cimetière is one of the Gede, a spirit of the dead, along with Baron Samedi and Baron La Croix in Vodou. He is said to be the guardian of the cemetery, protecting its graves.

He wears a tuxedo with tails and a top hat. He has expensive taste, smoking cigars and drinking wine and fine liquor. He is just as crass as the other Gede, but shows polite manners and an upper-class air while doing so.

Other manifestations
Brave Gede is the doorman between the world of the living and the afterlife, guardian of the cemetery gate. He keeps the dead in and the living out.

References

Haitian Vodou gods
Death gods
Liminal gods